Sankichi (written: 三吉) is a masculine Japanese given name. Notable people with the name include:

, Japanese photographer
, Japanese surgeon
, Imperial Japanese Navy admiral
, Japanese poet and activist

Japanese masculine given names